Hryhoriy Fedorovych Hrynko (in Shtepivka – March 15, 1938) was a Soviet Ukrainian statesman who held high office in the government of the Soviet Union.

Initially he was a member of the Socialist Revolutionary Party of Ukraine. After the October Revolution Hrynko became a leader of the Ukrainian Borotbists, and joined to the Communist Party (bolsheviks) of Ukraine when the Borotbists were dissolved by the Comintern.  As former member of the defunct pro-independence party he was purged in 1922 for "nationalist deviation", but regained favour during the effort for Ukrainization and made Ukrainian Commissar of the State Planning Committee of Ukraine in 1925.

He later served as finance minister of the Soviet Union in Moscow, from 1930 to 1937, replacing Nikolai Bryukhanov.

He was executed during the Great Purge in March 1938.  He was allegedly forced to publicly confess to his "nefarious" activities during the period of Ukrainization at Trial of the Twenty One with Christian Rakovsky and nineteen other members of the so-called Right Opposition.  These were former Soviet leaders, actual or presumed political enemies of Joseph Stalin, who were charged with opposing the policies of rapid industrialization, forced collectivization, and central planning, as well as international espionage, attempted overthrow of the Soviet Union, and planning to eliminate the Soviet leadership.

He was sentenced to death and shot on March 15, 1938. He was 47 years old. He was rehabilitated in 1959.

Notes

References 
 Magocsi, Paul Robert (1996). A History of Ukraine. Toronto: University of Toronto Press. . 
 Report of Court Proceedings in the Case of the Anti-Soviet ‘Bloc of Rights and Trotskyites’ Heard before the Military Collegium of the Supreme Court of the USSR, Moscow, March 2–13, 1938: Verbatim Report (Moscow 1938), pp 67–71, 718–721.  Cited in Magocsi (1996), p 568–70.

 

1890 births
1938 deaths
People from Sumy Oblast
People from Kharkov Governorate
Borotbists
Bolsheviks
Central Committee of the Communist Party of the Soviet Union candidate members
Central Executive Committee of the Soviet Union members
Directors of the State Planning Committee of the Ukrainian Soviet Socialist Republic
Soviet Ministers of Finance
Mayors of Kyiv
Case of the Anti-Soviet "Bloc of Rightists and Trotskyites"
Great Purge victims from Ukraine
Soviet rehabilitations
National University of Kharkiv alumni